The Union of Revolutionary Workers of Austria (Marxist–Leninist) was a communist group in Austria.

It was founded on June 22, 1968, created through a split of the MLPÖ. The principal leader of the VRAÖ was Alfred Jocha. It published the monthly magazine Der Kommunist 1967-1970, Für die Volksmacht (For People's Power) from 1970 to 1997 and again from 1999, and Widerspruch 1997-1999.

References

1968 establishments in Austria
2005 disestablishments in Austria
Communism in Austria
Defunct organisations based in Austria
Defunct political organizations
Maoist organizations in Europe
Political parties disestablished in 2005
Political parties established in 1968
Political organisations based in Austria